Selenops radiatus is a species of flatty in the spider family Selenopidae. It is found in Mediterranean, Africa, the Middle East, India, Myanmar, and China.

Subspecies
These two subspecies belong to the species Selenops radiatus:
 Selenops radiatus fuscus Franganillo, 1926
 Selenops radiatus radiatus Latreille, 1819

References

Further reading

 

Selenopidae
Articles created by Qbugbot
Spiders described in 1819